Jodrellia is a genus of flowering plants in the family Asphodelaceae, first described as a genus in 1978.
The genus is native to eastern + south-central Africa, and has two recognized species.

Species
 Jodrellia fistulosa (Chiov.) Baijnath - Ethiopia, Eritrea, Tanzania, Malawi, Zambia, Zimbabwe 
 Jodrellia migiurtina (Chiov.) Baijnath - Ethiopia, Somalia, Kenya

References

Asphodelaceae genera